Adhyāsa (Sanskrit:अध्यास Superimposition) is a concept in Hindu philosophy referring to the superimposition of an attribute, quality, or characteristic of one entity onto another entity. In Advaita Vedanta, Adhyasa means a false superimposition of the characteristics of physical body (birth, death, skin color etc.) onto the atman, and also the false superimposition of the characteristics of Atman (sentiency, existence) onto the physical body.

Origin  

The first mention of Adhyasa is found within the Brahma Sutra Bhasya of Adi Shankara. Adi Shankara begins his commentary of the Brahma Sutras by explaining what Adhyasa is and its nature. 

Shankara lists different views about Adhyasa from different philosophical schools, which suggests that the concept of Adhyasa certainly existed before Shankara.

Definition 

In his introduction to the commentary on Brahma Sutras, Shankara gives a definition of Adhyasa as thus - 

Swami Gambhirananda translates it as -

Karl H. Potter translates it as -

References 

Hindu philosophical concepts